Only the Young may refer to:
 "Only the Young" (Journey song), 1985
 "Only the Young" (Brandon Flowers song), 2010
 "Only the Young" (Taylor Swift song), 2020
 Only the Young (band), English band that competed in The X Factor in 2014